Perigona nigriceps is a species of ground beetle in the family Carabidae.

References

Further reading

External links

 

Harpalinae
Articles created by Qbugbot
Beetles described in 1831